Carreón or Carreon is a common Hispanic surname. It may refer to:

People 
 Alfonso Nava Carreón, Bishop of the modern Diocese of Thizica from 1969 to 1990
 Cam Carreon (1937–1987), American Major League Baseball player
 Charles Carreon (born 1956), American lawyer
 Francisco Carreón (1868–?), Filipino military leader
 Luis Arturo Hernández Carreón (born 1968), Mexican footballer
 Mark Carreon (born 1963), American Major League baseball player
 Phil Carreón (1923–2010), American big band leader from Los Angeles
 Lara and Sara Carreon, characters in the Philippine television drama series Impostora

See also
 Carrion (disambiguation)
 Carry On (disambiguation)